Admiral John Colville, 9th Lord Colville of Culross (15 March 1768 – 22 October 1849), styled Master of Colville from 1786 to 1811, was a Royal Navy officer who served as Commander-in-Chief, Cork Station.

Naval career
Colville was the second son of John Colville, 8th Lord Colville of Culross, and his wife Amelia Webber. He joined the Royal Navy in December 1775 and saw action in the fourth-rate  during the American Revolutionary War. He took part in the Battle of the Saintes in April 1782. Later that year he took part in the destruction of the French frigate Volontaire.

Colville became commanding officer of the fourth-rate  in October 1804, shortly before it was wrecked by incompetent pilots in November 1804, and then became commanding officer of the third-rate  in March 1807, in which he took part in the Battle of Copenhagen during the Napoleonic Wars. Following the incident in Lisbon and the subsequent surrender of the Russian Fleet during the Anglo-Russian War, he accompanied the Russian Fleet back to Portsmouth in September 1807. He went on to be commanding officer of the second-rate  in September 1811.

Promoted to rear admiral on 12 August 1819, Colville became Commander-in-Chief, Cork Station, with his flag in HMS Semiramis, in 1821. He was promoted to vice admiral on 22 July 1830 and to Admiral of the White on 23 November 1841. 

Colville succeeded to the peerage as Lord Colville of Culross on 8 March 1811, was elected a Scottish representative peer on 24 July 1818 and participated in ten successive parliaments until his death in October 1849.

Family
Colville married, firstly, Elizabeth Ford on 14 October 1790 and, following the death of his first wife, Anne Law on 15 October 1841.

References

1768 births
1849 deaths
Royal Navy admirals
Lords of Parliament
Scottish representative peers
John